Monna Vanna is a drame lyrique or opera in four acts by composer Henry Février. The opera's French libretto is by playwright Maurice Maeterlinck and is based on his play of the same name. The opera premiered on 13 January 1909 at the Académie Nationale de Musique in Paris.

Roles

See also 
 Mary Garden

External links 
Online French libretto
Online English libretto

Operas by Henry Février
French-language operas
1909 operas
Operas
Operas based on plays
Operas based on works by Maurice Maeterlinck
Operas set in Italy